Rhys Trimble (born in 1977) is a bilingual poet, teacher, visual poet, visual artist, musician and improvisational performance artist based in Wales. Trimble was born in Livingstone, Zambia in 1977, and was raised in Pontypool and latterly the head of the Neath Valley - Pontneddfechan. Trimble completed his first degree in Biochemistry in the University of Sussex in 1999. Trimble is considered an important part of Welsh avant garde. He completed a BA in literature and creative writing from Bangor University in 2010, and published his first book of poetry, Keinc, the same year. He received a PhD from the University of Northumbria at Newcastle. His doctoral thesis was titled "Tywysogion". He has authored more than 15 books of poetry in Wales, England, India and the US since 2010, including Swansea Automatic, Anatomy Mnemonics for Caged Waves (US) and Hexerisk. He is the vocalist with the Punk/Improv/Noise group Lolfa Binc. Trimble has contributed works to public art in Denbigh, Conwy Valley and Blackpool, Trimble was Nominated for the TS Eliot prize 2016.

He edits the experimental poetry e-zine ctrl+alt-del. since 2008. His work has been translated into Slovak Latvian  Anthologized in English  and Spanish Galicean, Croatian and Turkish. As an academic he has published articles in poetry Wales and had critical essays written on his work by Keely Laufer  and Dr Daniel Williams. Trimble has performed in a number of countries around the world, and has taken part in the Gelynion Wales tour  and the India-Wales international writing project. He is the founder of Awen 33 Arts, Bangor North Wales, and is currently visiting poet at Bangor University.

Publications

References

Further reading

External links 
 http://www.rhystrimble.com
 https://northumbria.academia.edu/RhysTrimble

1977 births
Living people
21st-century Welsh poets
21st-century Welsh artists